Perfect 10, Inc. v. Amazon.com, Inc., 508 F.3d 1146 (9th Cir., 2007) was a case in the United States Court of Appeals for the Ninth Circuit involving a copyright infringement claim against Amazon.com, Inc. and Google, Inc., by the magazine publisher Perfect 10, Inc. The court held that framing and hyperlinking of original images for use in an image search engine constituted a fair use of Perfect 10's images because the use was highly transformative, and thus not an infringement of the magazine's copyright ownership of the original images.

The case originated as a suit against Google, with Amazon being added as another defendant at the Circuit Court hearings, because Amazon used thumbnail images that had been obtained from Google.

Background
Perfect 10 was an adult entertainment magazine that featured sexually provocative images of women. It also operated a subscription-only website featuring such images and leased some of these images to other businesses. A number of independent, third-party website publishers placed images obtained from Perfect 10's subscription-only area on their own websites, violating Perfect 10's terms of service and copyright. 

Google crawls, indexes, and caches websites on its internal servers so they can be accessed quickly. The sites crawled included many of the third-party sites containing Perfect 10's copyrighted images images. As part of its image search service, Google also provides thumbnail copies of the images that are being searched for, so the user may see them before accessing the website. Furthermore, when a user selects an image from a Google search, a new page is accessed that includes the original website as well as a frame that contains information about the image and the thumbnail version of the image. Google did not store or physically transmit the full images, only their thumbnails.

Perfect 10 believed the linking constituted secondary copyright infringement, and the caching and thumbnails constituted direct infringement. Beginning in May 2001, Perfect 10 sent notices to Google informing it of specific links to infringing images in its general Web search and requesting their removal. In May 2004, it began sending similar notices for Google's new image search functionality. Google states that it complied with the notices where it could find the infringement and determine that it was in fact an infringement, removing the images from Google Search.

However, Google noted that it was unable to do this in many cases due to deficiencies in the requests. Perfect 10 sent Google infringement notifications for nearly four years, eventually filing suit against both Google and Amazon for similar activities. Perfect 10 requested injunctions against Google and Amazon from linking to websites displaying Perfect 10's images and, in the case of Google, displaying the thumbnail images.

District Court opinion
Perfect 10 filed suit against Google in the United States District Court for the Central District of California in 2004, asserting various copyright and trademark infringement claims, including direct, contributory, and vicarious copyright infringement. After settlement discussions lasting several months, Perfect 10 filed for a preliminary injunction that would require Google to stop linking to and distributing its images. The district court granted partial injunctive relief in favor of Perfect 10. Specifically, it ruled that Google's thumbnail images of the copyrighted content were likely to be found infringing, while the hyperlinks to sites hosting the copyrighted content were not likely to be found infringing in and of themselves. Google subsequently appealed the injunction against displaying the thumbnail images while Perfect 10 appealed the district court's decision on the hyperlinks.

Direct infringement
Perfect 10 made two claims of direct infringement.

Framing 
First, Perfect 10 argued that Google's framing of infringing websites constituted direct infringement, and it requested that Google be enjoined from continuing this practice. The district court found that Google would infringe the distribution and display rights by framing others' content only if it hosted and physically transmitted the content itself (the "server test"). The court rejected Perfect 10's argument that the relevant question should be whether the content is visually incorporated into the site (the "incorporation test"). Since Google only provided an instruction for the user's computer to fetch the infringing pages from servers not under its control, rather than hosting or transmitting the content itself, the court found that Perfect 10 was unlikely to succeed on this point, and so denied its request for an injunction.

Thumbnails
Second, Perfect 10 argued that Google's creation and distribution of thumbnail images was direct infringement, and requested that Google be enjoined from creating and distributing thumbnails of its images. Google did not dispute that it displayed and distributed protected derivative works of the plaintiff's images. However, it argued that the use of the works in such thumbnails was protected under the copyright doctrine of fair use. The district court found that Google's use of the images was commercial and partially transformative (intended to serve a fundamentally different purpose than the originals). The court found Google's use highly commercial, more so than in Kelly v. Arriba Soft Corporation (which was prevailing precedent), due mainly to its AdSense program, which a number of the infringing sites used. Also distinguishing the case from Kelly, the court noted that in 2005 Perfect 10 leased the right to distribute reduced-size versions of its images for use on cell phones to Fonestarz Media Limited, putting it in direct competition with Google's thumbnails. Therefore, the court ruled that this factor "weigh[ed] slightly in favor" of Perfect 10.

The court rejected Google's argument that the images were uncreative; however, since the works in question were all published, it ruled that this factor too weighed only slightly in favor of Perfect 10. The court also ruled that Google's infringement meant "[c]ommonsense dictates that [cell phone] users will be less likely to purchase the downloadable P10 content licensed to Fonestarz", and that this factor weighed against Google.

On Google's claim for the fair use defense, the court analyzed the four factors of fair use and concluded:

Therefore, the court ruled that Perfect 10 was entitled to injunctive relief for Google's use of thumbnail images.

Contributory infringement
There are two types of secondary copyright infringement: contributory and vicarious. Contributory copyright infringement occurs if someone intentionally encourages direct infringement. Vicarious infringement occurs if a party: (1) could stop or limit the direct infringement but does not, and (2) profits from the direct infringement.

Perfect 10 alleged both forms of secondary liability for infringement: first, that Google committed contributory infringement by encouraging users to visit infringing sites; and second, that it committed vicarious infringement by profiting from infringement. As summarized by MGM v. Grokster, "One infringes contributorily by intentionally inducing or encouraging direct infringement... and infringes vicariously by profiting from direct infringement while declining to exercise a right to stop or limit it."

According to Sony Corp. of America v. Universal City Studios, Inc., secondary liability could not be found "based on presuming or imputing intent to cause infringement solely from the design or distribution of a product capable of substantial lawful use, which the distributor knows is in fact used for infringement." The court ruled that Google did not, in any case, facilitate infringement, essentially because "[infringing] websites existed long before Google Image Search was developed and would continue to exist were Google Image Search shut down". Therefore, the court found that Perfect 10 did not demonstrate its likelihood to succeed in a contributory infringement claim, and consequently denied injunctive relief.

With respect to vicarious infringement, the court held that Google derived direct financial benefit from infringement of Perfect 10's copyright (in the form of AdWords and AdSense profits), but that it had no power to stop the infringements even if it knew of them. Therefore, the court found Perfect 10 unlikely to succeed in a vicarious infringement claim, and consequently denied injunctive relief.

Ninth Circuit opinion
Perfect 10 appealed the district court decision, at which point Amazon was added to the proceedings because Perfect 10 learned that Amazon was displaying thumbnail images obtained from Google. On appeal, the Ninth Circuit upheld the district court's decision that the hyperlinks did not infringe on Perfect 10's copyright. It agreed with the district court's assessment that infringing websites existed before Google and would continue to exist without Google, thus it was not a contributory infringer. Furthermore, Google had no control over infringing sites and could not shut them down, so any profits it may or may not extract from users visiting those sites did not constitute vicarious infringement. The court also agreed that including an inline link is not the same as hosting the material itself. So in the case of framing, while it may "appear" that Google was hosting infringing material, it was only hosting a link to the material which the browser interpreted should appear in a certain way.

The Ninth Circuit did, however, overturn the district court's decision that Google's thumbnail images were unauthorized and infringing copies of Perfect 10's original images. Google's claimed that these images constituted fair use, and the circuit court agreed. This was because they were "highly transformative." The court did not define what size a thumbnail should be but the examples the court cited was only 3% of the size of the original images. Most other major sites use a size not longer than 150 pixels on the long side. Specifically, the court ruled that Google transformed the images from a use of entertainment and artistic expression to one of retrieving information, citing the precedent Kelly v. Arriba Soft Corporation. The court reached this conclusion despite the fact that Perfect 10 was attempting to market thumbnail images for cell phones, with the court quipping that the "potential harm to Perfect 10's market remains hypothetical."

The court pointed out that Google made available to the public the new and highly beneficial function of "improving access to [pictorial] information on the Internet." This had the effect of recognizing that "search engine technology provides an astoundingly valuable public benefit, which should not be jeopardized just because it might be used in a way that could affect somebody's sales."

Google also raised a Digital Millennium Copyright Act (DMCA) safe harbor defense in respect to the issue of hyperlinks, which Perfect 10 contested. However, the court did not reach an opinion on the matter as it found that Perfect 10 was unlikely to succeed on the matters of contributory and vicarious liability because of the other arguments.

See also
 Copyright aspects of hyperlinking and framing

References

External links
 Court Opinion, Ninth Circuit Court of Appeals
 Electronic Frontier Foundation page on Perfect 10 v. Google (including copies of appeal briefs)
 Court Opinion, Central District of California
 A law review article about the case: 

2007 in United States case law
United States Internet case law
United States copyright case law
United States Court of Appeals for the Ninth Circuit cases
Amazon (company)
Perfect 10 (magazine) litigation
United States District Court for the Central District of California cases
2006 in United States case law
Fair use case law
Google litigation